Balanacan Port is the major port in the island province of Marinduque, Philippines. It is located at the north-western tip of the province in Barangay Balanacan at the town of Mogpog, and is managed by the Philippine Ports Authority.

Port Operation
The main shipping lines operating are Montenegro Shipping Lines and Starhorse Shipping Lines. Routes are mainly to and from Dalahican, Quezon.

Expansion
In 2020, despite the COVID-19 pandemic in the Philippines, the PPA was set to complete Balinacan Port's expansion along with 17 other ports the agency operates.

References

 

Ports and harbors of the Philippines
Buildings and structures in Marinduque
Transportation in Luzon